The women's 200 metres event at the 1991 Summer Universiade was held at the Don Valley Stadium in Sheffield on 23 and 24 July 1991.

Medalists

Results

Heats

Wind:Heat 1: +1.8 m/s, Heat 2: +2.3 m/s, Heat 3: +3.9 m/s

Final

Wind: +1.6 m/s

References

Athletics at the 1991 Summer Universiade
1991